Rica, Famosa, Latina (Rich, Famous, Latina) is an Estrella TV reality series which was co-created by Lenard Liberman of Estrella TV, and by Joyce Giraud. The Spanish-language show was inspired by the Real Housewives franchise.

Rica, Famosa, Latina premiered on September 16, 2014, and followed five financially successful Latina women in Los Angeles. Castmembers in the first season included Estela Mora, Rosie Rivera, Adriana Gallardo, Victoria Del Rosal and Elisa Beristain, the wife of Pepe Garza.
Adriana Gallardo departed the show after the season ended, and she did not attend to the season reunion.

The second season in 2015, which premiered on Estrella TV on Monday, March 30, 2015. Elisa Beristain, Estela Mora, Rosie Rivera and Victoria del Rosal returned to another season, With Sissi Fleitas Sandra Vidal, Luzelba Mansour and   Maria Raquenel Join the Main Cast. Veronica Pliego join the cast in the episode 12 with a Friend Role. Gallardo had a guest appearance in the first episode. Mayeli Alonso also appeared as a guest in several episodes before joining the cast next season, as a friend of Elisa Beristain. Rosie Rivera,  Estela Mora,  Elisa Beristain, Maria Raquenel and  Verónica Pliego departed the show after the season ended.  Estela Mora 
did not attend to the season reunion.

The third Season premiered on Estrella TV on September 21, 2015. With the return of Victoria Del Rosal, Sandra Vidal, Luzelba Mansour and Sissi Fleitas. Niurka Marcos, Mayeli Alonso, and Andrea Garcia, join the cast. Rosie Rivera appeared as a guest in the second episode at the event of Jenni Vive.

The fourth season premiered on Estrella TV on September 6, 2016. With the same cast of the last season. Beristain appeared as a guest in the episode 23 and Rosie Rivera was seen on camera in the episode 30 at Mayeli's party.  Mayeli Alonso,  Victoria Del Rosal, Andrea Garcia and  Sissi Fleitas departed the show after the season ended.

The fifth season premiered on Estrella TV on September 18, 2017. Sandra Vidal, Luzelba Mansour, and Niurka Marcos, return to the show. Ninette Rios, Mimi Lazo, Scarlet Ortiz, and Patricia De Leon, join the cast. 

In January 2022 it was confirmed that the show would return with a sixth season. Luzelba Mansour,  Sandra Vidal and Mayeli Alonso returned to the show, while Niurka Marcos, Mimi Lazo, Ninette Rios, Scarlet Ortiz and Patricia De Leon did not. In their places, Marcela Iglesias, Mariana González and Kimberly Flores joined the cast.

Timeline

Series overview

References

External links
Website at Estrella TV

2010s American reality television series
2014 American television series debuts
2017 American television series endings
Spanish-language television programming in the United States
Women in Los Angeles